Cloverdale Rodeo and Country Fair is an annual rodeo and fair located in the town of Cloverdale in Surrey, British Columbia. It is held annually at the Cloverdale Fairgrounds during the Victoria Day holiday weekend, from the Friday to Monday.

Attendance in 2006 was over 20,000.

History

The fair was first held in September 1888 in the Surrey Municipal Hall and grounds. In 1938, the fair was moved to its current location at the Cloverdale Fairgrounds.

The rodeo was first held in 1945 and proved so popular that it was taken over by the Lower Fraser Valley Agricultural Association in 1947.

In 1962, the fair was taken over by the Fraser Valley Exhibition Society, and in 1994, the fair and rodeo were renamed the Cloverdale Rodeo & Exhibition Association.

In 1996, the 109-year-old annual fall fair was incorporated into the May rodeo weekend.

In 2007, after controversy over the death of a calf, the rodeo announced that it would drop four timed events, thus disqualifying itself from the Canadian Professional Rodeo Association (CPRA) circuit.

There was no fair and rodeo from 1917 to 1918 because of World War I and from 1942 to 1944 because of World War II. It was cancelled again from 2020 to 2022 because of COVID-19 restrictions. It is scheduled to return in 2023.

Events

There are cooking, baking and canning competitions, arts and crafts displays and horticulture and livestock exhibits.

Since 1977, on the Thursday before the Fair, there has been a bed race in downtown Cloverdale, sponsored by the Chamber of Commerce. The races went virtual in 2020–21.

A parade is held on the Saturday of the Fair, and a midway hosts games and rides.

For children, there are 4H club displays and children's entertainers.

Controversy

The rodeo is an annual target of animal rights activists, who allege that bucking straps, electric prods, spurs and physical abuse are used to terrorize the animals into action. For the past several years, animal right activists have moved their protests into the arena, using banners and handcuffing themselves to the gates of bucking chutes.

In 2007, activists from Vancouver, British Columbia animal rights group Liberation BC entered the rodeo ring to protest the death of a calf in a roping event at the previous day's show. Pamela Anderson targeted the Cloverdale Rodeo that same year by writing a letter urging corporate sponsors to end their partnership with the rodeo, stating that "the calf roping event is particularly cruel". Following this controversy the Cloverdale Rodeo announced that it would cut ties with the professional circuit by dropping four timed events including: tie-down roping, team roping, cowboy cow milking and steer wrestling. Cowboy cow milking was discontinued as a Canadian Professional Rodeo Association event after 2009.

See also
Cloverdale Fairgrounds
Rodeo bareback rigging

References

External links
Cloverdale Rodeo & Country Fair

Rodeos
Annual fairs
Sport in Surrey, British Columbia
1888 establishments in British Columbia
Fairs in British Columbia
Recurring events established in 1888